Call the Comet is the third studio album by the English musician Johnny Marr. It was released on 15 June 2018 by New Voodoo and Warner Bros. Records.

Critical reception 

Call the Comet received generally positive reviews from music critics upon its release. At Metacritic, which assigns a rating out of 100 to reviews from critics, the album scored an average rating of 78, based on 16 reviews. Writing for the Associated Press, Mark Kennedy opined that it was "easily his best as a solo artist, deep and rich both musically and lyrically" before concluding, "So feel free to stay in bed, Morrissey. Marr is who we need now." Writing for Hot Press, Edwin McFee rated the album 8 out of 10. MusicOMH contributor Neil Dowden awarded the album 4 out of 5 stars, calling it Marr's "most ambitious and interesting work under his own name". Creative Loafing contributor Gabe Echazabal rated it 4.5 out of 5, writing, "Call the Comet is, simply put, Marr's strongest solo effort. It's a magnificent piece of work that serves as a true testament to the idea that Marr has plenty to offer musically at this stage of his career, and it clearly showcases his continued and ever-present vitality." Clash Music contributor Will Rosebury rated the album 7/10 and called it "easily Johnny Marr’s most confident solo album".

Robert Steiner of The Boston Globe, however, disagreed with those other critics, starting his review by writing that Marr's time with the Smiths cemented his legacy as one of rock's greatest sidemen, "[b]ut that's the key word: sidemen." He went on to write that Marr is at his best working with other creative minds and all he does as a solo artist is "produce groggy rehashes of old Brit-rock tropes he helped create three decades ago." He concluded his review by stating Call the Comet could be a passable album if it was the work of a young band rather than someone "who inspired guitarists in some of those bands to pick up their instruments in the first place."

Writing for Pitchfork, contributor Stephen Thomas Erlewine of AllMusic gave a more mixed rating of 6/10, writing that after spending "a quarter-century as a hired gun, roaming from project to project", Marr "is starting to slow down in his middle age".

Track listing

Personnel 
Musicians
 Johnny Marr – vocals, guitars, keyboards
 James Doviak – keyboards, vocals
 Iwan Gronow – bass guitar, vocals
 Jack Mitchell – drums

Production and additional personnel

 Claudius Mittendorfer – mixing
 Frank Arkwright – mastering
 Sonny Marr – backing vocals on "Walk Into the Sea" and "Spiral Cities"
 Niall Lea – photo
 Mat Bancroft – artwork
 Laura Turner – artwork

Single releases
"Hi Hello" was released as a 7" single, with the new B-side "Jeopardy". "Jeopardy" was also released on the Japanese edition of "Call The Comet" as a bonus track and is available digitally.

"Spiral Cities" was later also released as a single digitally and on 7", along with the new B-side "Spectral Eyes".

Videos were made for both of these singles as well as the album tracks "The Tracers" and "Walk Into The Sea".

Charts

References 

2018 albums
Johnny Marr albums